Johann Gottlieb Grabbe (1585–1655) was a German composer.

A child prodigy, he became a member of the Bückeburg Court choir at 11, learned the organ from Cornelius Conradus, succeeded him as organist, and was then, like Heinrich Schütz, awarded a scholarship to study with Giovanni Gabrieli in Venice. While there, Grabbe published his Primo libro of madrigals as his graduation thesis.

References

External links
 

German Baroque composers
German classical composers
German male classical composers
Madrigal composers
1585 births
1655 deaths
17th-century classical composers
17th-century male musicians
Expatriates of the Holy Roman Empire in the Republic of Venice